"Robot Man" is a 1960 song performed by Connie Francis.  It was written by the songwriting team of Sylvia Dee and George Goehring. 

The song became a hit in the United Kingdom, reaching #2 on the UK Singles Chart in 1960.  It was also a hit in Australia (#3) and New Zealand (#4).

Another version of the song was released in the U.S. in 1960 by singer Jamie Horton on the Joy label. It reached #87 on the Music Vendor Top 100 and #12 on the Cash Box Looking Ahead chart.

In "Robot Man," the singer wishes for a man who is an automaton instead of "a real-life boy" to "give her grief" and leave her "crying in her handkerchief."  A robotic man would be dependable and predictable, with no need to worry about him cheating, neglecting her, lying to her or arguing with her.

Chart history

References

External links
 

1960 songs
1960 singles
Connie Francis songs
MGM Records singles
Songs about robots